(Benzothiazol-2-ylthio)methyl thiocyanate  (TCMTB) is a chemical compound classified as a benzothiazole.

Properties 
TCMTB is an oily, flammable, red to brown liquid with a pungent odor that is very slightly soluble in water. It decomposes on heating producing hydrogen cyanide, sulfur oxides, and nitrogen oxides. The degradation products are 2-mercaptobenzothiazole (2-MBT) and 2-benzothiazolesulfonic acid.

Uses 
TCMTB is used as wideband microbicide, paint fungicide, and paint gallicide. The active substance approved in 1980 in the United States. It is used, for example, in leather preservation, for the protection of paper products, in wood preservatives, and against germs in industrial water.

In the US, TCMTB is used as a fungicide for seed dressing in cereals, safflower, cotton and sugar beet.

It is also used when dealing with fungal problems when extracting hydrocarbons via fracking.

Approval 
TCMTB is not an authorized plant protection product in the European Union.
In Germany, Austria and Switzerland, no plant protection products containing this active substance are authorized.

TCMTB contributes to health problems in tannery workers as it is a potential carcinogen, and is a hepatotoxin. It is also a skin sensitizer, and may cause contact dermatitis in those exposed to the poisonous compound.  Hence, it is mainly used in developing countries.

References 

Benzothiazoles
Thioethers
Thiocyanates
Biocides
Fungicides